St. John's Episcopal Church is a historic Episcopal church on East Battleboro Avenue in Battleboro, Edgecombe County, North Carolina. The church was built in 1891, and is a one-story, board-and-batten frame building with a steep gable roof.  It features lancet windows and a tower with crenellated top and pyramidal spire. The church was consecrated in 1896.

It was listed on the National Register of Historic Places in 1971.

References

Episcopal church buildings in North Carolina
Churches on the National Register of Historic Places in North Carolina
Churches completed in 1891
19th-century Episcopal church buildings
Churches in Edgecombe County, North Carolina
National Register of Historic Places in Edgecombe County, North Carolina